Piz Lad is a mountain of the Swiss Ortler Alps, overlooking Santa Maria Val Müstair in the canton of Graubünden. It lies north of Piz Umbrail.

References

External links
 Piz Lad on Hikr

Mountains of the Alps
Mountains of Switzerland
Mountains of Graubünden
Ortler Alps
Two-thousanders of Switzerland
Val Müstair